David Williams (7 October 1931 – 2 March 2012) was an English professional footballer who played as a wing half.

Williams died in Toronto on 2 March 2012, at the age of 80.

References

1931 births
2012 deaths
Footballers from Sheffield
English footballers
Association football wing halves
Beighton Miners Welfare F.C. players
Grimsby Town F.C. players
English Football League players